Montemignaio is a comune (municipality) in the Province of Arezzo in the Italian region Tuscany, located about  east of Florence and about  northwest of Arezzo.

Montemignaio borders the following municipalities: Castel San Niccolò, Pelago, Pratovecchio, Reggello, Rufina.

References

Cities and towns in Tuscany